Lee Kim Yew (born 19 August 1955) is a Malaysian entrepreneur, businessman and philanthropist. He was the founder and chairman of Country Heights Holdings Berhad and was among the first to venture into property development with country-living concept. Under Country Heights Holdings Berhad, he established various projects such as the Palace of the Golden Horses, The Mines and GHHS Healthcare.  

In 2023, he stepped down  as the chairman of Country Heights Holdings Berhad, and has since become an advisor for the group.

Career 
In 1985, Lee started off into property development. He has worked on various sites in North Borneo, Mauritius, Johannesburg and London. Some of his earliest work include turning an abandoned rubber estate into residences with quality landscaping and converting an open-cast mining land into the Mines Wellness City.

Other projects that he has undertaken include the Borneo Highlands Resort and the Hornbill Golf & Jungle Club in Sarawak which won the CNBC Award for Best Golf Development Malaysia in 2008.

Business Ventures

Country Heights Holdings Berhad 
Founded by Lee, Country Heights Holdings Berhad is an investment holding company listed on the Main Market of Kuala Lumpur Stock Exchange that operates in real estate development and construction, real estate investing and management, hotel, and golf resort. Country Heights also provides educational, computer, leisure, marketing, health screening, exhibition centre and event management services.

Projects under Country Heights include the Mines Resort and Golf Club, Country Heights Damansara, Country Heights Kajang, Borneo Highlands, Palace of the Golden Horses, Excel Exhibition Centre (London) and Pecanwood Golf and Country Club (South Africa).

Golden Horses Health Sanctuary Healthcare 
As a Corporate Social Responsibility initiative, Lee expanded his business into the healthcare and wellness industry in 2001 with the establishment of Golden Horses Health Sanctuary (GHHS) Healthcare, a dedicated preventive health screening centre within a resort.

Golden Horse Digital Investment Bank 
In 2021, Lee founded Golden Horse Digital Investment Bank Ltd (GHDIB). GHDIB is a fully-licensed and regulated digital investment bank, offering investment accounts alongside a digital asset exchange and a range of lending products.

Other Ventures

Global Chinese Economic & Technology Summit 
In 2009, Lee and fellow Malaysian entrepreneur Tan Sri Michael Yeoh founded the World Chinese Economic Forum, which was later rebranded into World Chinese Economic Summit. In 2021, with the rapid rise of technology and innovation, it was rebranded again into the Global Chinese Economic & Technology Summit.

The summit is an annual international forum that promotes business linkages, connectivity, shared prosperity and sustainability, with the purpose to enhance connections between China, the world and global Chinese diasporas. It brings together the government, businesses and scholars to cover diverse topics such as the role of technology in business, education, healthcare and economic growth.

Malaysia Association for Advancement of Functional and Interdisciplinary Medicine (MAAFIM) 
Lee is also the patron of the Malaysia Association for Advancement of Functional and Interdisciplinary Medicine (MAAFIM), a national association that facilitates the growth of science, research, education, and continued professional development, with the goal of promoting evidence-based medical care as well as offering guidance on policy related to Interdisciplinary Medicine

Philanthropy

Bantu-bantu Malaysia 
During Malaysia’s Movement Control Order (MCO) in March 2020, Lee initiated Bantu-bantu Malaysia, a non-profit social welfare initiative. The initiative supplied masks and personal protection equipment (PPEs), food baskets and other essentials to the mid to low-income groups. More than 30,000 food baskets and other food necessities were distributed by Bantu-bantu Malaysia.

Bantu-bantu Malaysia has also donated masks, surgical gowns, ventilators, PPEs, surgical masks, and N95 grade masks to medical staff and front-liners of private and government hospitals as well as NGOs in various states, such as Kuala Lumpur, Sabah, and Kelantan. Food was also distributed to the JAWI Food Bank, Social Welfare Department, Majlis Agama Islam Wilayah Persekutuan, Army Veterans, and other NGOs.

Other measures 
During the beginning of MCO, the Palace of the Golden Horses initiated a culinary programme for orphans, old folks, single mothers, foreign employees and students within a 5-kilometer radius of the hotel.

Personal life 
Apart from his career, Lee is passionate about golf. One of his business premises, The Mines Resort & Golf Club, has held golf tournaments and events, such as the 2017 Southeast Asian Games golf competitions, 1999 World Cup of Golf and others

Lee is a devoted Buddhist and frequently holds exhibitions at the Palace of the Golden Horses to celebrate the Guan Yin goddess as well as showcase his collection of Guan Yin statues

Lee is a strong believer in Chinese Philosophy. He practices Confucianism and I-Ching.

References

External links 
Country Heights Holdings Berhad
GHHS Healthcare

Malaysian businesspeople
1955 births
Living people